Jamuni is a village development committee in Bardiya District in the Lumbini Province of south-western Nepal on the border with India. At the time of the 1991 Nepal census it had a population of 9,584 and had 1648 houses in the town.

Jamuni might also refer to the color purple in Hindi.

Villages in Jamuni
Sitapur
Shantipur
Thulo Danphe
Sano Danphe
Phutaha
Jamuni

References

Populated places in Bardiya District